Andrea James is an Aboriginal Australian playwright and theatre director, best known for her plays Yangali Yangali and Sunshine Super Girl, the latter about tennis star Evonne Goolagong Cawley.

Early life and education
Andrea James is a Yorta Yorta/Gunaikurnai woman, who also has Polish and Tamil heritage. She is the great-granddaughter of Thomas Shadrach James and granddaughter of Shadrach Livingstone James

She graduated from the Victorian College of the Arts.

Career
James has produced plays for Carriageworks, Blacktown Arts Centre, Urban Theatre Projects, La Mama Theatre and Ilbijerri, among others. Her works have been staged throughout Australia as well as in the United Kingdom, Paris and New York City.

She worked as Aboriginal arts development officer at Blacktown Arts Centre, before being appointed as  Artistic Director of Melbourne Workers Theatre in 2001, occupying this role until 2008. It was here that she wrote and produced Yangali Yangali.

James' play Sunshine Super Girl, about Wiradjuri champion tennis player Evonne Goolagong Cawley, has been produced by Performing Lines. It premiered in Griffith, New South Wales in October 2020 (its Melbourne Theatre Company debut having been postponed owing to the COVID-19 pandemic in Victoria), subsequently being performed at the Sydney Festival in January 2021. The play is commencing a tour starting at the Darwin Festival in August 2022.

 James is an associate artist at the Griffin Theatre Company in Sydney, where she is producing Melissa Bubnic's Ghosting the Party which opened at the Stables Theatre, Sydney in May, until 18 June 2022.

Recognition and awards
 Recipient of an Arts NSW Aboriginal Arts Fellowship
 2013: Recipient ACCELERATE, a program run jointly by the Australia Council and British Council  for Aboriginal Art Leaders
 Writer-in-residence at Melbourne Theatre Company
 2022:  Mona Brand Award for Women Stage and Screen Writers, for her body of work

Works
Yangali Yangali
Coranderrk: We Will Show the Country (2016) (co-writer, with Giordano Nanni
 Blacktown Angels for Home Country
 Bukal
 Winyanboga Yurringa 
 Bright World
 Home Country
 The Torch
 Winyanboga Yurringa
 Dogged (co-writer, with Cath Ryan)

References

21st-century Australian dramatists and playwrights
Indigenous Australian writers
Living people
Year of birth missing (living people)